Whatmore is a surname. Notable people with the surname include:

A. R. Whatmore (1889–1960), British actor, playwright and producer of plays
Dav Whatmore (born 1954), former international cricketer who represented Australia
Ernie Whatmore (1900–1991), professional association footballer
Neil Whatmore (born 1955), English former footballer who played as a striker
Rachel Whatmore, fictional solicitor in the UK soap opera Emmerdale
Sarah Whatmore (born 1981), English singer, best known from the British TV series Pop Idol
Sarah Whatmore (geographer) (born 1959), Professor of Environment and Public Policy at Oxford University

See also
Watmore (surname)
Wetmore (disambiguation)
Whitmore (disambiguation)
Whittemore (disambiguation)